Prephenate transaminase may refer to:
 Glutamate—prephenate aminotransferase, an enzyme
 Aspartate—prephenate aminotransferase, an enzyme